Cheyne Stoking is the debut studio album by English heavy metal band Huron.

Track list 
 "Lust of War" – 3:18
 "Killer from New York" – 4:04
 "Snakes Down Her Back" – 4:12
 "Pain Is Me" – 4:17
 "Your View from the Sun" – 5:03
 "Your Sins from Yesterday" – 3:43
 "Break Your Neck" – 4:04
 "Hell Can Wait" – 4:57
 "Already Dead" – 4:56
 "Bringer of Light" – 4:15
 "Dirt" – 5:48

References 

2009 debut albums
Huron (English band) albums